Hugh Archibald Nairn Burden (3 April 1913 – 16 May 1985) was an English actor and playwright.

Hugh Archibald Nairn Burden was the eldest son of Harry Archibald Burden, a colonial official, and Caro Cecil née Jackson on 3 April 1913 in Colombo, Ceylon. He was educated at Beaumont College and trained at the Central School of Speech and Drama and RADA. He appeared on stage in repertory theatre in Croydon and in London's West End before military service in the Hampshire Regiment and the Indian Army from 1939 to 1942.

Burden made appearances in many UK television plays and series including Doctor Who: Spearhead from Space (1970), The Crezz (1976), Sykes (1979), Strange Report (1968) and The Avengers (1963). He played the title role in The Mind of Mr. J.G. Reeder (1969). His many film appearances include One of Our Aircraft Is Missing (1942), The Way Ahead (1944), Fame Is the Spur (1947), Malta Story (1953), Funeral in Berlin (1966), Blood from the Mummy's Tomb (1971) and The Ruling Class (1972).

Burden acted in radio plays and was known for readings of the works of T. S. Eliot and Evelyn Waugh. He also wrote several television and stage plays and was an Equity council member.

He married actress Joy Hodgkinson in 1950, and had a daughter with her, but the marriage was dissolved in 1955 on the grounds of her desertion. A subsequent marriage to Margaret de Lobera in 1957 was dissolved in 1962 on the grounds of his desertion.

Selected filmography
 Death Croons the Blues (1937) as Viscount Brent
 Ships with Wings (1942) as Sub.Lt. Weatherby
 One of Our Aircraft Is Missing (1942) as John Glyn Haggard—Pilot in B for Bertie
 The Way Ahead (1944) as Pvt. Bill Parsons
 Fame Is the Spur (1947) as Arnold Ryerson
 Sleeping Car to Trieste (1948) as Mills
 Ghost Ship (1952) as Dr. Fawcett
 Malta Story (1953) as Eden, Security
 No Love for Johnnie (1961) as Tim Maxwell
 The Secret Partner (1961) as Charles Standish
 Funeral in Berlin (1966) as Hallam
 The Inn Way Out (1967) as Husband, and Bastard Son (30 minute Short), with John le Mesurier
 The Best House in London (1969) as Lord Tennyson
 The Statue (1971) as Sir Geoffrey
 Blood from the Mummy's Tomb (1971) as Geoffrey Dandridge
 The Ruling Class (1972) as Matthew Peake
 The House in Nightmare Park (1973) as Reggie Henderson
 One of Our Dinosaurs Is Missing (1975) as Haines

References

External links
 

1913 births
1985 deaths
English male film actors
English male television actors
20th-century English male actors
British Army personnel of World War II
Royal Hampshire Regiment soldiers
Indian Army personnel of World War II